Emanuele Idini (born 18 December 1970 in Rome) is a retired freestyle swimmer from Italy, who represented his native country at two consecutive Summer Olympics: the 1992 Summer Olympics and the 1996 Summer Olympics.

He won the silver medal in the men's 4×200 m freestyle at the 1991 European Aquatics Championships, alongside Roberto Gleria, Stefano Battistelli, and Giorgio Lamberti. Four years later in Vienna, Austria he was a member of the team that claimed the bronze medal in the same event, partnering Massimiliano Rosolino, Emanuele Merisi, and Piermaria Siciliano.

References

 RAI Profile

1970 births
Living people
Swimmers at the 1992 Summer Olympics
Swimmers at the 1996 Summer Olympics
Olympic swimmers of Italy
Swimmers from Rome
Italian male freestyle swimmers
World Aquatics Championships medalists in swimming
European Aquatics Championships medalists in swimming
Mediterranean Games gold medalists for Italy
Mediterranean Games medalists in swimming
Swimmers at the 1991 Mediterranean Games
Swimmers at the 1997 Mediterranean Games